Thor's Cave railway station was a station on the Leek and Manifold Light Railway. Serving the landmark Thor's Cave in Grindon and Wetton. The station site is now part of the Manifold Way.

History 
The station opened as Thor's Cave Halt on 29 June 1904. Its name was changed to Thor's Cave for Wetton in 1914 and changed to Thor's Cave in 1929. It closed on 12 March 1934.

Route

References

Disused railway stations in Staffordshire
Railway stations in Great Britain opened in 1904
Railway stations in Great Britain closed in 1934
1904 establishments in England
1934 disestablishments in England
Former Leek and Manifold Light Railway stations